Nicola "Nikki" Shadwick is a character in Channel 4 soap Brookside played by Suzanne Collins from 27 March 1998 until the programme's final episode on 4 November 2003. Nikki's storylines have included being "date-raped" by Luke Musgrove at a party at Number 5, hosted by Leo Johnson and Tim O'Leary. Not long after this ordeal, Nikki had to deal with the deaths of her father Greg and brother Jason after an explosion on Brookside Parade, and was also stalked by an obsessive friend at her University. Her younger sister Emily was killed during the Brookside Siege of 2002 and her mother then moved to Brussels. In the final episode of Brookside Nikki reveals she is going to live with her Mother Margi in Brussels.

Introduction
Builder Greg Shadwick bought No.6 (the bungalow) in 1998.  Promising to extend the house, the family of five moved into the small bungalow. The eldest daughter, Nikki, was a university student and seemed happy living on Brookside Close and got along with most people.

Rape

Rape and investigation
The first major storyline involving Nikki Shadwick was when she was date-raped at a Christmas party in 1998.  After passing out and being laid on a bed by revellers, Nikki awoke to find her clothing had been interfered with and she had been raped.  Nikki was convinced it was Luke Musgrove who raped her.  Luke was arrested but quickly skipped bail.  After a failed attempt to leave the country for his native Ireland, Luke finally handed himself in to the police.

Alcoholism following her ordeal
Following her ordeal Nikki took to drinking heavily in a similar way to how Sammy Rogers did several years earlier after her own ordeal. Nikki turned to Alcohol Concern for help and kicked her habit before the trial.

Court case
The case eventually came to court and Luke Musgrove was found not guilty.  He was, however, sent to prison for skipping bail. Nikki was distraught over the verdict and continued to accuse Luke of the rape after the trial.

Death of brother and father
In 1999 an explosion at Millennium Club, her father Greg, who was at the time having an affair with Susannah Farnham was killed.  He was found in a compromising position, naked in the shower with Susannah, who escaped with minor injuries.  Her brother Jason was killed by falling rubble trying to rescue her father.  Nikki took the tragedy well, however her mother Margi didn't and moved to Brussels, while her younger sister Emily also took it badly and started a hate-campaign against Susannah.

Luke's admission
Still accusing him of rape, Nikki attempted to drug him in a night club.  After her plan failed she went up onto the roof.  Luke followed her and the two talked.  After failing to get him to admit to the rape, she threatened to jump from the roof, Luke finally admitted under duress that he had drugged Nikki and raped her.  The entire Musgrove family fled their home under the cover of night following his admission.

Engagement to Jerome
Nikki later starts seeing Jerome Johnson.  After a while she proposes to him and he accepts.  Jerome however has an affair with Nisha Batra.  When Nikki finds out about this she breaks off their engagement during their engagement party.

Friendship with Jimmy Corkhill

A new father figure
Following the death of her father, Nikki began to see Jimmy Corkhill as a father figure and the two became good friends.  Jimmy's daughter Lindsay suspects Nikki has an ulterior motive, however for the time being her intentions remain platonic.  Jimmy finds Nikki to be a great help in coming to terms with his bi-polar disorder.

Nikki cares for Jimmy
After Jimmy is found walking through the Mersey Tunnel claiming to be walking to Newcastle upon Tyne, he is sectioned with the consent of his wife Jackie.  While in a secure psychiatric hospital, Jimmy decides he wants to divorce Jackie and she finally leaves.  Being as Jackie has left and his daughter Lindsay lives away the doctors are concerned about releasing him if there is no-one there to ensure he takes his medication.  After much consideration and against the advice of everyone she knows, Nikki volunteers for this role.  Jimmy's behaviour becomes increasingly erratic and it puts strain on their friendship, leaving Nikki wondering if she has made the right decision.

The siege

Held hostage
In October 2002 a gang of armed bank robbers are chased by police into Brookside Close.  The robbers break into the houses and take many hostage.  Nikki is caught as a hostage in Jimmy's house along with Jimmy, Tim O'Leary and her sister Emily Shadwick.  During the siege Nikki is almost raped again and Jimmy's poor mental health starts to show under stress.  Later on Emily tries to escape, which results in her falling from a bedroom window.

Death of sister
Following the siege Emily is left in a coma.  Nikki and Tim keep a vigil at her bedside throughout but she dies several weeks later.  Nikki is distraught at the death of her younger sister, particularly being as her brother and father had died only three years earlier.  Nikki continued to live at No.6 on her own.

Infatuation with Jimmy
In the weeks after her sister's death Nikki became increasingly paranoid and unable to sleep at night.  Feeling vulnerable on her own in the bungalow, she asked friend Jimmy if she could spend the night at his house.  Feeling he owed her support after the support Nikki had given him during his breakdown Jimmy willingly allowed her to stay.

That night however Nikki left the spare room and asked Jimmy if she could sleep with him.  Jimmy reluctantly agreed and the two slept in the same bed.  The following morning Jimmy explained to Nikki that she was welcome to stay at his house as long as she liked but that it would cause him embarrassment if she were to sleep in his bed.  Nikki however had become infatuated with Jimmy and now saw him as more than a father figure.

Nikki continued to stay at Jimmy's house, although she stayed in the spare room.  Jimmy's daughter Lindsay became concerned that Nikki was taking advantage of Jimmy's fragile mental state while Tim became concerned that Jimmy was taking advantage of Nikki's recent bereavement.

Nikki told Jimmy how she felt about him and Jimmy explained it would be better if they remained friends.  Undeterred, Nikki continued to pursue Jimmy, until the two finally kissed in Jimmy's back garden.  The two later slept together.  Nikki was thrilled to have slept with Jimmy and thought they could become an item, however the following morning Jimmy was racked with remorse, feeling that Tim may have been right and he may have taken advantage of Nikki while she was vulnerable.  When Jimmy explained this to her Nikki took his rejection and decided to move on.

Relationship with Sean
When Jimmy decided to have satellite television installed at his house, Sean Smith came to install it.  Sean and Nikki got on well, however Jimmy didn't trust Sean.  When the two started going out together, Jimmy became jealous.  Sean became interested as to why Jimmy was so protective of Nikki.  Nikki explained that he saw her like a daughter.  Sean was happy with this explanation however he later found out that Jimmy and Nikki had slept together and Nikki had in fact lied to him.  Nikki and Sean later split up and Sean went back to his wife Ruth Smith and moved into No.5.

Nikki, Jimmy and Margi
After Nikki broke up with Sean she moved back into No.6.  Later on her mother Margi returned from Brussels.  Margi and Jimmy became close and after a while Margi planned to ask Jimmy to marry her.  Margi was stunned however when Jimmy beat her to it and asked her.  Margi was thrilled and agreed.  Later on however when Jimmy found out there was a possibility he had lung cancer he broke off the engagement, not wanting to be a burden to Margi and make her a widow twice over.  Jimmy didn't want anyone to know about his lung cancer and so did not explain this to Margi, leaving her furious with Jimmy.  Nikki was also furious with Jimmy and said she would never forgive him.  Later when Jimmy found that he didn't have lung cancer, but another fatal disease, asbestosis he explained to Nikki and she forgave him.

The end
After terrorising the neighbourhood, Jack Michaelson is lynched by the neighbours.  While all the neighbours are either in on his murder or glad of it, Nikki is the only one who feels sorry for him.  Nikki then sells her house to Cinerco and decides to move to Brussels to live with her mother.  One of the last scenes in Brookside is of Jimmy and Nikki burning Jimmy's furniture in his front garden.  During this scene, writer Phil Redmond scripts a discussion between her and Jimmy where Jimmy has a rant about reality television as well as deriding urban migration, organised religion and advocating the legalisation of drugs.

References

Shadwick Nikki
Shadwick Nikki